Department of Morale Affairs is the department responsible for the media and psychological centers of the Egyptian Armed Forces, which specializes in several tasks including psychological insurance for members of the armed forces to protect them from any deviation, and make recommendations in order to be all individuals in good spirits and do not affect the performance of combat. It carries out studies for public leadership help to identify the positive and negative effects before or after making a decision. Also collaborated in the development of skills and abilities and intellectual leadership of the leaders in the various levels, especially those with special tasks. And cooperation in the proper selection of leaders and individuals to assume positions of process by the job description.

References

Military of Egypt
Defence agencies of Egypt